Talladale  is a village on the southwestern shore of Loch Maree in Ross-shire, Scottish Highlands and is in the Scottish council area of Highland.

References

Populated places in Ross and Cromarty